The 1960–61 European Cup was the sixth season of the European Cup, UEFA's premier club football tournament. The competition was won by Benfica, who won 3–2 in the final against Barcelona, who had knocked out Spanish rivals Real Madrid, winners of the first five tournaments, in the first round. Benfica was the first Portuguese team to reach the final and to win the tournament. For the first time a Norwegian club participated.

Preliminary round
The draw for the preliminary round took place at UEFA headquarters in Paris, France, on 7 July 1960. As title holders, Real Madrid received a bye, and the remaining 27 teams were grouped geographically into three pots. The first team drawn in each pot also received a bye, while the remaining clubs would play the preliminary round in September.

The calendar was decided by the involved teams, with all matches to be played by 30 September.

|}

First leg

Second leg

Benfica won 5–1 on aggregate.

Újpesti Dózsa won 5–1 on aggregate.

Young Boys won 9–2 on aggregate.

Fredrikstad won 4–3 on aggregate.

AGF won 3–1 on aggregate.

CDNA Sofia won 4–3 on aggregate.

IFK Malmö won 5–2 on aggregate.

Rapid Wien won 4–1 on aggregate.

Stade Reims won 11–1 on aggregate.

Barcelona won 5–0 on aggregate.

Bracket

First round

|}

1 Rapid Wien beat Wismut Karl Marx Stadt 1–0 in a play-off to qualify for the second round.

First leg

Second leg

Benfica won 7–4 on aggregate.

AGF won 4–0 on aggregate.

Wismut Karl Marx Stadt 3–3 Rapid Wien on aggregate.

Rapid Wien won 1–0 in a play-off.

IFK Malmö won 2–1 on aggregate.

Barcelona won 4–3 on aggregate.

Spartak Hradec Králové won 1–0 on aggregate.

Burnley won 4–3 on aggregate.

Hamburg won 8–3 on aggregate.

Quarter-finals

|}

First leg

Second leg

Benfica won 7–2 on aggregate.

Rapid Wien won 4–0 on aggregate.

Barcelona won 5–1 on aggregate.

Hamburg won 5–4 on aggregate.

Semi-finals

|}

1 Barcelona beat Hamburg 1–0 in a play-off.

First leg

Second leg

Game abandoned with two minutes to play due to crowd riots and pitch invasion.

Benfica won 4–1 on aggregate.

Hamburg 2–2 Barcelona on aggregate.

Barcelona won 1–0 in play-off.

Final

Top scorers
The top scorers from the 1960–61 European Cup (including preliminary round) are as follows:

References

External links
1960–61 All matches – season at UEFA website
European Cup results at Rec.Sport.Soccer Statistics Foundation
 All scorers 1960–61 European Cup (excluding preliminary round) according to protocols UEFA
1960-61 European Cup – results and line-ups (archive)

1960–61 in European football
European Champion Clubs' Cup seasons